The 1974–75 Edmonton Oilers season was the Oilers' third season of operation. The Oilers placed last and failed to make the playoffs.

Offseason

Regular season

Final standings

Schedule and results

Playoffs

Player statistics

Note: Pos = Position; GP = Games played; G = Goals; A = Assists; Pts = Points; +/- = plus/minus; PIM = Penalty minutes; PPG = Power-play goals; SHG = Short-handed goals; GWG = Game-winning goals
      MIN = Minutes played; W = Wins; L = Losses; T = Ties; GA = Goals-against; GAA = Goals-against average; SO = Shutouts;

Awards and records

Transactions

Draft picks
Edmonton's draft picks at the 1974 WHA Amateur Draft.

Farm teams

See also
1974–75 WHA season

References

External links

Ed
Ed
Edmonton Oilers seasons